The August 1981 Fermanagh and South Tyrone by-election was the second by-election in the same year, held in Fermanagh and South Tyrone on 20 August 1981. It was seen by many as a rerun of the earlier contest in April. The by-election was caused by the death of the IRA hunger striker and MP Bobby Sands.

Background of the constituency

The constituency, based on the districts of Fermanagh and Dungannon, was created in 1950 and had seen a series of closely fought elections between unionist and Irish nationalist candidates, with several elections being won due to the absence of competing candidates on one side or the other.

The April by-election was a straight contest between Sands, standing as "Anti-H-Block/Armagh Political Prisoner" and the former Ulster Unionist Party MP and leader Harry West, with no other candidates standing. Sands won with a majority of 1446 (with 3280 spoilt ballot papers).

Candidates in the 1981 by-election

Following Sands' victory and death shortly afterwards, the British government passed the Representation of the People Act barring prisoners from standing for Parliament. As a result, another prisoner on hunger strike could not be nominated. Instead Owen Carron, who had served as Sands' agent in the earlier election, was nominated as an "Anti-H-Block Proxy Political Prisoner".

The Ulster Unionists nominated a new candidate, Ken Maginnis, who had recently retired from the Ulster Defence Regiment with the rank of Major, who was on the liberal wing of the party. Maginnis was unusual amongst Ulster Unionist candidates as he had never been a member of the Orange Order.

The new by-election also saw four additional candidates stand. Seamus Close stood for the Alliance Party of Northern Ireland even though this was traditionally one of their weakest areas. Tom Moore stood for the Workers Party Republican Clubs who were associated with the Official IRA. Two fringe candidates also stood: Martin Green on a "General Amnesty" ticket and Simon Hall-Raleigh as "The Peace Lover."

Results

There were 804 spoilt votes.

Compared to the April election, turnout rose by 1.7%, whilst there were over two and a half thousand fewer spoilt papers. Most of these additional votes went to the additional parties standing.

References

External links
Campaign literature from the by-election

By-elections to the Parliament of the United Kingdom in County Fermanagh constituencies
By-elections to the Parliament of the United Kingdom in County Tyrone constituencies
1981 elections in the United Kingdom
20th century in County Fermanagh
20th century in County Tyrone
1981 elections in Northern Ireland
1981 Irish hunger strike